David Russell Batten (13 December 1926 – 11 September 2013) was a New Zealand sprinter who won two bronze medals at the 1950 British Empire Games.

Early life and family
Born in Christchurch on 13 December 1926, Batten was the son of Rawhiti Eric (Raj) Batten and Maudie Batten (née Burnett). He was educated at Christchurch Boys' High School. In 1954 he married Barbara Alice Jones in Christchurch; the couple went on to have two children but later divorced. In 1980 he married Joan Elizabeth Le Cren (née Cornish).

Athletics
Batten won national junior athletics titles over 100 yards and 220 yards in 1945. He then won seven senior national titles: the 100 yards in 1947; 220 yards in 1948, 1949, 1950 and 1951; and the 440 yards in 1949 and 1950. He set a national junior record for 100 yards in 1945, and in 1950 he broke the New Zealand record over 220 yards.

At the 1950 British Empire Games in Auckland, Batten won two bronze medals; one in the men's 440 yards, and one as part of the men's 440 yards relay alongside John Holland, Derek Steward and Jack Sutherland. He also reached the semi-finals of the men's 220 yards.

Death
Batten died in Christchurch on 11 September 2013.

References

1926 births
2013 deaths
Athletes from Christchurch
People educated at Christchurch Boys' High School
New Zealand male sprinters
Commonwealth Games bronze medallists for New Zealand
Athletes (track and field) at the 1950 British Empire Games
Commonwealth Games medallists in athletics
20th-century New Zealand people
Medallists at the 1950 British Empire Games